Leszek Malinowski (born 31 May 1959 in Koszalin) is Polish cabaret artist, actor and scenarist. He is member of cabaret Koń Polski.

He was a director or Radio Północ.

Filmography 

 1999: Badziewiakowie
 2000: Skarb sekretarza
 2002: Jest sprawa...
 2004: Polskie miłości
 2004: Cudownie ocalony

External links 
 
 Leszek Malinowski at filmpolski.pl
 Leszek Malinowski at filmweb.pl

Living people
1959 births
Polish male actors